The Europe Zone was one of the two regional zones of the 1948 Davis Cup.

25 teams entered the Europe Zone, with the winner going on to compete in the Inter-Zonal Final against the winner of the America Zone. Czechoslovakia defeated Sweden in the final, and went on to face Australia in the Inter-Zonal Final.

Draw

First round

Great Britain vs. India

Hungary vs. Austria

Romania vs. France

Spain vs. Sweden

Switzerland vs. Pakistan

Ireland vs. Luxembourg

Denmark vs. Egypt

Turkey vs. Yugoslavia

Second round

Netherlands vs. Portugal

Norway vs. Great Britain

France vs. Hungary

Sweden vs. Switzerland

Ireland vs. Denmark

Yugoslavia vs. Italy

Czechoslovakia vs. Brazil

Belgium vs. Argentina

Quarterfinals

Great Britain vs. Netherlands

Hungary vs. Sweden

Italy vs. Denmark

Czechoslovakia vs. Belgium

Semifinals

Sweden vs. Great Britain

Italy vs. Czechoslovakia

Final

Czechoslovakia vs. Sweden

References

External links
Davis Cup official website

Davis Cup Europe/Africa Zone
Europe Zone
Davis Cup